, a subsidiary of small entertainment conglomerate Hip Land Group, is a Japanese record label formed in 1988.

Sublabels
Its sublabels include:
RD Records, 
Monte Bleu, 
on the beach, 
basque, 
GrindHouse Recordings, 
MirrorBall, 
Plants Label, 
nest, 
Minor Swing, 
Middle Tempo Production,
In the Garden,
HLM Label,
I Want the Moon,
Parabolica, and
we are

Hip Land Group
Greens Corporation
Kiss Corporation
Sweet Boon Music, Inc.
Longfellow Agency (Bump of Chicken's agency)

Artists
Past and present artists on the label include Gontiti, Misako Odani, Ego-Wrappin', Clazziquai, Sakanaction, Bump of Chicken, Lena Park, cutman-booche, Small Circle of Friends, Britain, Naomi and Goro, Lamp, Improve, copa salvo, Bamboo Swing, Studio Apartment, The Little Elephant, K.P.M., Ohta-San, J'ouvert, Steve and Teresa, Blindspott, Lacuna Coil, A Static Lullaby, Aphesia, Yesterday's Rising and Shellshock.

Talents
 Lena Park (Japan)
 Shirley Tomioka (radio DJ, FM802)
 Mayumi Chiwaki (radio DJ, FM Cocolo)
 Sakanaction
 Bump of Chicken (through Longfellow Agency)
 Ego-Wrappin' (through Sweet Boon Music)
 Gontiti (through Sweet Boon Music)
 Avengers in Sci-Fi
 Misako Odani

See also
 List of record labels

References

External links
 
Hip Land Group 

Japanese record labels
Record labels established in 1988